Annora Bourgeault is a Canadian musician, singer-songwriter, and beauty pageant titleholder from Regina, Saskatchewan. Her debut album, The Ocean, was released in 2020. She was crowned Miss World Canada 2014 and represented Canada at Miss World 2014 in London.

Early life
Annora is the youngest of three children, with older two brothers. In her spare time she enjoys outdoor adventures. As an artist she plays piano, guitar, and writes & sings her own songs. Her genres of music include jazz, folk, and country.

Pageants
Miss World Canada 2014

Annora was crowned Miss World Canada 2014 at the conclusion of the pageant held in Surrey at Surrey's Bell Performing Arts Centre on May 11, 2014. She won the crown and title over 40 other contestants

Miss World 2014

Annora represented Canada at Miss World 2014 in London.

Category
Miss World Canada

References

External links
 

Canadian beauty pageant winners
Living people
Canadian people of French descent
Musicians from Regina, Saskatchewan
Year of birth missing (living people)
Miss World 2014 delegates